Anu is a given name and surname found independently in several cultures. The Indian name is a short form of Anuradha, Anurag, Anubhooti, etc. The Finnish and Estonian name is derived from the Karelian variant of the name Anna, which became popular after Kersti Bergroth's play Anu ja Mikko of 1932. The Nigerian name which means 'Mercy', is a short form of Anuoluwa, Anuoluwapo, etc from the Western Yoruba tribe.

Notable persons

Given name

Indian origin 
 Anu Aga (born 1942), Indian businesswoman and social worker
 Anu Aggarwal (born 1969), former Indian model and actress
 Anu Aiyengar, finance professional
 Anu Choudhury (born 1979), Indian actress
 Anu Elizabeth Jose, Indian Malayalam-language lyricist
 Anu Garg (born 1967), American author and speaker
 Anu Hasan (born 1968), Indian Tamil-language actress and TV anchor
 Anu Lama, Nepalese women's footballer
 Anu Malhotra (born 1961), Indian film-maker
 Anu Malik (born 1960), Indian Hindi-language music director and singer
 Anu Mohan, Indian Malayalam-language actor
 Anu Mohan (Tamil actor), Indian actor and film maker
 Anu Muhammad (born 1956), Bangladeshi economist and political activist
 Anu Prabhakar (born 1980), Indian Kannada-language actress
 Anu Ramamoorthy, Malaysian actress and model
 Anu Ramdas (born 1980), interdisciplinary artist living in Denmark
 Anu Singh (born 1972), Australian convicted of the manslaughter of her boyfriend, later became criminologist
 Anu Vaidyanathan (born 1983 or 1984), Indian triathlete

Estonian or Finnish origin 
 Anu Aun (born 1980), Estonian film director, producer and screenwriter
 Anu Kaal (born 1940), Estonian opera singer
 Anu Kaipainen (1933-2009), Finnish writer
 Anu Kaljurand (born 1969), Estonian hurdler
 Anu Kalm (born 1960), Estonian graphic artist and illustrator
 Anu Koivisto (born 1980), Finnish backstroke swimmer
 Anu Korb (born 1950), Estonian folklorist
 Anu Lamp (born 1958), Estonian actress
 Anu Nieminen (born 1977), Finnish female badminton player
 Anu Palevaara (born 1971), Finnish actress, choreographer and dancer
 Anu Põder (1947–2013), Estonian sculptor
 Anu Realo (born 1971), Estonian psychologist
 Anu Saagim (born 1962), Estonian socialite, editor and journalist
 Anu Tali (born 1972), Estonian conductor
 Anu Vehviläinen (born 1963), Finnish former Minister of Transport
 Anu Välba (born 1974), Estonian TV and radio host
 Anu Viheriäranta (born 1982), Finnish ballet dancer

Other 
 Anu Solomon (born 1994), American footballer (Hawaiian)
 Queen Anu (died 1696), Mongolian noblewoman and warrior
 Anu Namshir (born 1991), Mongolian miss and model
 Neferkamin Anu,  ancient Egyptian pharaoh
 Anu or A Nu, a character in the video game The Legend of Sword and Fairy

Surname 
 Christine Anu (born 1970), Australian pop singer of Torres Strait Islander descent

See also

Ant (name)

Indian feminine given names
Finnish feminine given names
Estonian feminine given names